James Thabiso Monyane (born 30 April 2000) is a South African soccer player currently playing as a right-back for Orlando Pirates.

At the youth international level he played in the 2016 COSAFA Under-17 Championship and the 2019 FIFA U-20 World Cup.

Career statistics

Club

Notes

References

2000 births
Living people
South African soccer players
South Africa under-20 international soccer players
South Africa youth international soccer players
Association football defenders
South African Premier Division players
Orlando Pirates F.C. players
Footballers at the 2020 Summer Olympics
Olympic soccer players of South Africa